Son of the South may refer to:

 Son of the South (film), a 2020 American biographical drama film
 Son of the South (album), a 1986 album by David Allan Coe
 Son of the South, a 2017 album by Upchurch (musician)
 "Son of the South", a song by the Afghan Whigs from their 1990 album Up in It

See also
Sons of the South, Lebanese terrorist group